State Route 172 (SR 172) is a primary state highway in the U.S. state of Virginia. The state highway runs  from SR 134 in Hampton north to Poquoson Avenue in Poquoson. SR 172 is the main north–south highway through Poquoson and the primary access road to Langley Air Force Base and NASA's Langley Research Center.

Route description

SR 172 begins at an interchange with SR 134 (Neil Armstrong Parkway) in the northern part of the independent city of Hampton. The interchange was changed from a trumpet interchange to a partial cloverleaf interchange to accommodate a westward extension of Commander Shepard Boulevard. SR 172 heads east as a four-lane divided highway on the highway named for Alan Shepard, the first American in space. The state highway meets the northern end of Armistead Avenue, which leads to the main entrance of Langley Air Force Base, as it curves to the north. SR 172 intersects Langley Boulevard, the main entrance to Langley Research Center, then passes between the NASA research center and Langley Speedway. As the boulevard curves back to the west, shortly before reconnecting with SR 134, SR 172 turns north onto Wythe Creek Road.

SR 172 continues as a four-lane undivided highway until north of another gate to the research center, where the highway becomes two lanes. The state highway leaves the research center vicinity by crossing Brick Kiln Creek, a tributary of the Back River, into the city of Poquoson. SR 172 expands to a five-lane road with a center left-turn lane as it approaches the center of Poquoson, where the highway intersects SR 171, which heads west as Victory Boulevard and east as Little Florida Road. The state highway reduces to three lanes just south of its northern terminus at Poquoson Avenue. The road continues north as Yorktown Road, which soon turns west while Hunts Neck Road continues north toward the northern extremity of Poquoson.

Major intersections

References

External links

Virginia Highways Project: VA 172

172
State Route 172
State Route 172